The superkingdom Metakaryota was defined by Thomas Cavalier-Smith as advanced eukaryotes resulting from the endosymbiosis of a proteobacterium, giving rise to the mitochondrion, by an archezoan eukaryote. However, with the collapse of the Archezoa hypothesis (that amitochondriate eukaryotes were basal), this grouping was abandoned in later schemes.

References 

Obsolete eukaryote taxa